Heinrich Hentzi von Arthurm (24 October 1785 - 21 May 1849)  was a Hungarian general in the army of the Austrian Empire.   He was famous for his refusal to defect to the Hungarian rebels during the Battle of Buda in 1849, defending Buda city and castle on behalf of the Austrian Habsburgs.

Born in Debrecen, Hentzi's military career reached a climax in April 1849 when, as Austrian forces evacuated Pest, he established a defense on the Buda side of the river, based on the castle there.  Holding out against a Hungarian siege for over a month, Hentzi refused to capitulate. When the nationalist general Artúr Görgey appealed to Hentzi's Magyar ancestry in an attempt to secure his surrender, Hentzi replied while he had indeed been born in Hungary, his loyalty was to the Kaiser. Hentzi was killed when Hungarian forces stormed Buda and its castle in late May 1849.

Legacy
Hentzi's refusal to join the Hungarian nationalists and his lengthy defense of Buda has been credited with preventing a Hungarian invasion of Austria in the spring and summer of 1849.

In Hungary he is remembered for the bombardment of the city of Pest during the siege. Many civilian buildings were destroyed during the bombardment, which Hentzi ordered to discourage the Hungarian troops from the siege by terrorizing the civilian population. The city of Pest had no military significance, and general Görgey promised not to attack the castle from the side facing Pest, but that if Hentzi fired at Pest than he would show no mercy. 

A hero to Habsburg loyalists, Hentzi was honored with a statue in Budapest.  A source of irritation to Hungarian nationalists, the statue was the focal point of tensions in 1886.  When the city's army commander, Generalmajor Ludwig Janski decorated the Hentzi sculpture, riots and denouncements followed, as well as fights and duels between army officers and Hungarian nationalists. The disruption was so severe that Crown Prince Rudolf advocated an armed intervention. No such measure was taken but the government in Vienna refused to punish the officers involved. General Janski was transferred to a divisional command elsewhere. 

The statue controversy was minimized in 1899 when, in an effort to appease Hungarian sentiment, the Hentzi sculpture was removed from its prominent place in Saint George Square and placed inside the courtyard of the cadet school in Budapest.

References

Bibliography
 

1785 births
1849 deaths
18th-century Hungarian people
19th-century Hungarian people
Hungarian soldiers
Hungarian military personnel
People from Debrecen
Hungarian Revolution of 1848
Austrian Empire military personnel of the Napoleonic Wars